Sitting on the Moon is a 1936 American musical film directed by Ralph Staub and released by Republic Pictures.

Plot 
Songwriter Danny West wakes up with an unknown woman in a taxi outside the film studio Regent Pictures Inc. where he works. He remembers little from the night before. The woman is still asleep and Danny asks the driver to drop her off where they picked her up.

Danny and songwriting colleague Mike are tasked with delivering a song to studio executive Tucker.

Actress Polly Blair once walked out on Tucker, and now he won't even hire her for the chorus. Polly's friend Mattie offers moral support. Danny recognize Polly from when she chose his and Mike's song "Who Am I" for her movie "Fugitive Princess". The song became a hit and was Danny's big break. Danny writes the song "Sitting on the Moon" for Polly and she performs it with Charlie Lane and his ensemble.

Right before Danny and Polly's engagement party, Danny and Mike are fired from the film studio. Charlie has signed with a broadcaster from New York and wants Polly to come along, but she turns down the offer because she wants to stay with Danny. The woman from the taxi, Blossom, shows up at the party and says that she and Danny got married that night. She leaves, and soon thereafter a heartbroken Polly and Mattie leaves too.

Blossom relays to Danny that she'll accept a divorce in exchange for $10,000 in cash. Mike invites Danny to come along to New York, but Danny declines.

Polly is successful on New York radio's "Happy Go Lucky Hour" and creates record sales. Mike finds out that Charlie, who signed Polly to him, is making $3,500 but only paying Polly $100.

Danny travels to New York, hits Charlie, and Charlie raises Polly's salary to $1,000 a week. Polly is excited to hear that Danny is in town. Frank sends Danny a newspaper clip of Blossom reading she has "eleven husbands" in a racketeering run with the taxi driver. Against the show owner's expressed wishes, Polly interrupts her live show to sing "Lost in My Dreams", which Danny wrote for her. Charlie refuses to conduct and walks out, and Polly starts singing  a cappella. Three musicians hired by Danny joins her, and then the ensemble follows. The show owner invites Polly to stay on the show and offers Danny to write songs for her.

Cast 

Roger Pryor as Danny West
Grace Bradley as Polly Blair
William Newell as Mike
Pert Kelton as Mattie
Henry Kolker as Worthington
Henry Wadsworth as Charlie Lane
Joyce Compton as Blossom Dawn
Pierre Watkin as Tucker
William Janney as Young Husband
June Martel as Young Wife
The Theodores as Themselves (singing group)
Jimmy Ray as Feature Dancer
Harvey Clark as Hotel Manager
George Cooper as Jim Daggett, Taxi Driver

Soundtrack 
 Roger Pryor - "Sitting on the Moon" (Written by Sidney D. Mitchell and Sam H. Stept)
 Grace Bradley with orchestra - "Sitting on the Moon"
 Roger Pryor - "Lost in My Dreams" (Written by Sidney D. Mitchell and Sam H. Stept)
 Roger Pryor - "How Am I Doin' With You" (Written by Sidney D. Mitchell and Sam H. Stept)
 Grace Bradley, with Roger Pryor on piano - "Who Am I?" (Written by Sidney D. Mitchell and Sam H. Stept)
 Roger Pryor - "Theme from Tannhauser" (Performed as a rag) (Music by Richard Wagner)

The song "Sitting on the Moon" was recorded by
 Jimmie Grier and his orchestra with vocals of Redd Harper
 Henry "Red" Allen and his orchestra with vocals of Henry "Red" Allen
 Joe Haymes and his orchestra with vocals of Cliff Weston

The song "Lost in My Dreams" was recorded by
Henry "Red" Allen and his orchestra with vocals of Henry "Red" Allen
 Jimmie Grier and his orchestra with vocals of Dick Webster
 Joe Haymes and his orchestra with vocals of Ronnie Chase

References

External links 

1936 films
1936 musical films
American black-and-white films
American musical films
Films directed by Ralph Staub
Republic Pictures films
Films produced by Nat Levine
1930s English-language films
1930s American films